GM or Gm may refer to:

Companies 
 General Motors, US automobile manufacturing company which was founded in 1908
 Motors Liquidation Company, the US automobile manufacturing company known as General Motors Corporation from 1916 to 2009
 General Mills, US food manufacturing company
 Gunn & Moore, UK sports equipment company

Places 
 The Gambia, by ISO 3166 code
 Germany, by FIPS 10-4 country code
 Greater Manchester, England

Sports and gaming
 RGM-79 GM, a mobile suit series in the video game Mobile Suit Gundam
 Gamemaster or game master, a person officiating in a multiplayer role-playing game
 Grandmaster (chess)
 Grandmaster (martial arts)
 GM (magazine)

Science and measurement
 Geiger–Müller tube or G-M tube, a type of radiation detector
 Genetic modification or genetically modified, manipulation of an organism's genome
 Gigametre or gigameter (Gm), one billion metres
 Silty gravel, in the Unified Soil Classification System
 Standard gravitational parameter 
 Metacentric height, related to ship stability
 Transconductance, an electronic component parameter
 GM, unit of cross section named after Maria Goeppert Mayer

Other uses 
 Gm (digraph)
 GM chassis or Gusenichnaya Machina, a Russian tracked vehicle chassis
 G minor, chords and scale
 General manager
 General MIDI, a standardized specification for music synthesizers
 Genital mutilation
 George Medal, a UK, primarily civil, decoration for acts of great bravery
 Gold master, a version of software to be distributed to customers, i.e. ready for release to manufacturing
 Google Maps
 Gunner's mate, a US Navy rating

See also

 GM1, a ganglioside in brain biochemistry
 Gram, a unit of mass, usually abbreviated "g" rather than "gm"
 Grandmaster (disambiguation)
 
 
 MG (disambiguation)
 G (disambiguation)
 M (disambiguation)